John Dolphin (26 August 1804 – 21 June 1889) was an English amateur cricketer who played first-class cricket from 1825 to 1827.

Education 
Dolphin, son of Rev. John Dolphin (d. 1831), was educated at Eton and Trinity College, Cambridge (admitted pensioner 29 June 1824, matriculated Michaelmas 1824), Cricket blue, 1827, BA 1828.

Career 
As a cricketer he was mainly associated with Cambridge University and made 6 known appearances in first-class matches; a member of the Norfolk County XI, 1828–42. In later life he was a clergyman; Ordained deacon (London) 1 June 1828, priest, 14 June 1829, Curate of Wakes Colne, Essex, 1828–30, Rector of Pebmarsh, 1831–42, Rector of Antingham St Mary with Thorpe Market, and Bradfield, Norfolk, 1830–89, Rural Dean of Repps, 1869–87.

Personal life 
He married, 1833, Mary, 4th daughter of Admiral Western, of Tattingstone Park, near Ipswich.

References

1804 births
1889 deaths
English cricketers
English cricketers of 1787 to 1825
English cricketers of 1826 to 1863
Cambridge University cricketers
Norfolk cricketers
People educated at Eton College
Alumni of Trinity College, Cambridge
People from Bourton-on-the-Water
Sportspeople from Gloucestershire